The Ottawa Senators are a professional ice hockey team based in Ottawa, Ontario, Canada.  They are members of the Atlantic Division of the Eastern Conference of the National Hockey League (NHL).  The Senators joined the NHL in 1992 as an expansion franchise, and as of the conclusion of the 2021–22 NHL season, have made the Stanley Cup playoffs 16 of the last 25 seasons. 422 different players have worn the Senators jersey as of the end of the 2021–22 season; of them, 42 are goaltenders, while 380 are skaters.

Daniel Alfredsson, Bobby Ryan, Craig Anderson and Erik Karlsson are the only players in franchise history to win major individual awards in the NHL. Alfredsson won the Calder Memorial Trophy in 1996, the King Clancy Memorial Trophy in 2012, and the Mark Messier Leadership Award in 2013. Ryan won the Bill Masterton Trophy in 2020, Anderson won the Bill Masterton Trophy in 2017, and Karlsson won the James Norris Memorial Trophy in 2012 and 2015. Alfredsson was captain of the Senators from 1999–2013, and is the team's all-time leader in playoff games played and regular season/playoff goals, assists and total points. Chris Phillips leads the Senators in regular season games played with 1,179;  Alfredsson is second with 1,178 appearances. Chris Neil is the all-time leader in penalty minutes accrued, with 2,522 minutes in 1,026 regular season games, and 204 minutes in 95 playoff games.

Patrick Lalime and Craig Anderson hold team records in most goaltending categories. Lalime leads all goaltenders in franchise history in regular season and playoff shutouts, as well as playoff appearances.  Anderson leads all goaltenders in regular season appearances and wins.  Lalime and Anderson are tied for most playoff wins.

Key
 Current member of the Senators organization (including minors)
 Stanley Cup winner, retired jersey or elected to the Hockey Hall of Fame

The seasons column lists the first year of the season of the player's first game and the last year of the season of the player's last game. For example, a player who played one game in the 2000–01 season would be listed as playing with the team from 2000–01, regardless of what calendar year the game occurred within.

Statistics are complete to the end of the 2021–22 NHL season.

Goaltenders

Skaters

See also
List of Ottawa Senators (original) players

References

General

Specific

Ottawa
 
players